Cue reactivity is a type of learned response which is observed in individuals with an addiction and involves significant physiological and subjective reactions to presentations of drug-related stimuli (i.e., drug cues).

In investigations of these reactions in people with substance use disorders, changes in self-reported drug craving, physiological responses, and drug use are monitored as they are exposed to drug-related cues (e.g., cigarettes, bottles of alcohol, drug paraphernalia) or drug-neutral cues (e.g., pencils, glasses of water, a set of car keys).

Scientific theory
Cue reactivity is considered a risk factor for recovering addicts to relapse. There are two general types of cues: discrete which includes the substance itself and contextual which includes environments in which the substance is found. For example, for an alcoholic an alcoholic beverage would be a discrete cue and a bar would be a contextual cue. There are many different reactions to cues including withdrawal-like responses, opponent process responses, and substance-like responses.

A meta-analysis of 41 cue reactivity studies with people that have an alcohol, heroin, or cocaine addiction strongly supports the finding that people who have addictions have significant cue-specific reactions to drug-related stimuli. In general, these individuals, regardless of drug of abuse, report robust increases in craving and exhibit modest changes in autonomic responses, such as increases in heart rate and skin conductance and decreases in skin temperature, when exposed to drug-related versus neutral stimuli. Surprisingly, despite their obvious clinical relevance, drug use or drug-seeking behaviors are seldom measured in cue reactivity studies. However, when drug-use measures are used in cue reactivity studies the typical finding is a modest increase in drug-seeking or drug-use behavior.

Development

Clinical implications
Since people with substance use disorders are highly reactive to environmental cues previously associated with drug use, a common treatment strategy is to advise them to avoid people and situations formerly associated with drug use. For example, a person attempting to quit smoking should avoid other people who smoke and places where smoking is prevalent (like bars in places where smoking is allowed in bars). Although the relationship between cue reactivity in the laboratory and relapse to drug use in the real world is still poorly understood, considerable anecdotal evidence from drug treatment programs and smoking cessation counselors suggests that people with substance use disorders who seek treatment are more successful at remaining abstinent if they take special care to avoid cues associated with prior drug use.

See also
 Conditioned place preference
 Nucleus Accumbens – Addiction

References

Addiction
Behaviorism